Max Uhlig (born 23 June 1937 in Dresden) is a German painter. He won the Hans Theo Richter-Preis of the Sächsische Akademie der Künste in 1998.

Career 
From 1955 to 1960, Uhlig studied at the Dresden University of Fine Arts with Hans Theo Richter and Max Schwimmer.

From 1961 to 1963, he was a master student at the German Academy of the Arts in Berlin with Hans Theo Richter. He then worked as a freelancer until 1995. In 1968, he worked with Carlfriedrich Claus on the creation of his first prints (lithographs); later prints were also made for Charlotte E. Pauly, Dieter Goltzsche, Willy Wolff, Otto Niemeyer-Holstein, Heinrich Ehmsen, Hans Theo Richter and Wilhelm Höpfner. Until the early 1970s, the artist emerged only as a graphic artist. In 1978, Max Uhlig presented his characteristic paintings for the first time in the Dresden Kupferstichkabinett.

"Black and white or in colour, lines in the expressive rhythm of their superimposition draw the image mode and the conciseness of an extensive, unmistakable work that is a discovery. Today Max Uhlig is one of the last representatives of the era of open-air painting in modern art that began 150 years ago, but his work elevates it to the height of our time." His late work received significant impulses from annual stays in Faucon (southern France) from 1991 to 2010.

In June 2013, Uhlig's designs for the design of the glass windows for the Gothic St. John's Church in Magdeburg, which was rebuilt from 1994 to 1999, were accepted. The artist himself has been painting directly on glass in the Derix workshops in Taunusstein since spring 2014. From July to October 2014, the drafts and initial work results were on view in the exhibition "Max Uhlig. Grown before nature. Painting and graphics" in the art museum Kloster Unser Lieben Frauen Magdeburg.

Max Uhlig has been a member of the German Association of Artists since 1990 and a founding member of the Saxon Academy of the Arts. From 1995 to 2002, he was the professor for painting and graphics at the University of Fine Arts in Dresden.

As a Dresden painter, Uhlig had already become known before 1989 through participation in exhibitions in Western Europe outside the borders of the GDR. He has been awarded several national and international prizes, including the 1987 Käthe-Kollwitz-Preis of the Akademie der Künste der DDR, the 1991 2nd prize of the 21st International Biennale of São Paulo and the gold medal of the 10th Norsk Internasjonal Grafikk Biennale Fredrikstad, the 1998 Hans-Theo-Richter-Preis and the Saxon Order of Merit, the 2003 art prize of the state capital Dresden and the art prize of the artists on the occasion of the great art exhibition North Rhine-Westphalia in Düsseldorf 2006.

Max Uhlig has been married to Angela Simon since 1999 and now lives and works in the Helfenberg district of Dresden on the site of a former chemical factory.

Exhibitions 

 2014 "Grown before nature", Art Museum Magdeburg Monastery of Our Dear Women
 2013 "People, Scenes, Landscapes", Gallery Klose, Essen
 2013 "Man and Landscape", Käthe-Kollwitz-Museum Cologne
 2012 "Druck", Kupferstichkabinett, Dresden
 2012 "Painting and Works on Paper", Kunstverein Die Wassermühle e.V., Lohne
 2012 "Works on Paper", Palais Leopold, Munich
 2012 "Waiting and Passers-by", Beeskow Castle, Beeskow
 2011 "Watercolors and colored drawings from three decades", Galerie Döbele, Dresden
 2011 "Max Uhlig, Claus Weidensdorfer Works on Paper", Brandenburgische Kunstsammlungen Cottbus
 2011 "Max Uhlig - Black - from the graphic work", Galerie Scheffel, Bad Homburg
 2010 "Art in GDR Times: Three Nonconforms", Loeper Gallery, Hamburg
 2009 "In Dialogue with Nature", Gallery Klose, Essen
 2008 "Artist of the gallery: Angelika Bartholl, Max Uhlig", Gallery von Loeper, Hamburg
 2007 Galerie Oben, Chemnitz
 2007 "Drawings", Ningbo Museum of Art, Ningbo (China) and Leonhardi Museum, Dresden
 2007 "Landscapes", Heck Art Gallery, Chemnitz
 2007 "Retrospective on the 70th", Galerie am Sachsenplatz, Leipzig
 2006 "Here Byoung", San Xiang Art Space, Shanghai
 2006 Gallery Dr. Lehr, Berlin
 2006 "Symbol Wuyi", San Shang-Art, Beijing and Shanghai Art Museum
 2005 "Head. Figure. Landscape", Loeper Gallery, Hamburg
 2004 "Works from 50 Years", Beethovenstrasse Gallery, Düsseldorf
 2004 "Change of Seasons", Kunsthalle Dominikanerkirche, Osnabrück
 2004 Aalen Art Association, Aalen
 2003 "Portraits and Landscapes", Gallery Klose, Essen
 2002 German Society for Christian Art, Munich
 2001 Saxon Academy of Arts, Dresden
 2001 "Early Works 1960-1980", Galerie Oben, Chemnitz
 2000 "Head Studies + Landscape", Scheffel Gallery, Bad Homburg
 1999 "Pictures and works on paper 1970 to 1999", Galerie von Loeper, Hamburg
 1999 "Portraits", Galerie Stefan Röpke, Cologne and Galería Arnés y Röpke, Madrid
 1998 Municipal Gallery, Schwäbisch Hall
 1998 Beethovenstrasse Gallery, Düsseldorf
 1997 Döbele Gallery, Dresden
 1997 Gallery at Sachsenplatz, Leipzig
 1996 "Paysage De La Provence. New Portraits", Loeper Gallery, Hamburg
 1996 "Discovered in the studio - pictures never shown", Beethovenstrasse Gallery, Düsseldorf
 1995 "For 40 years", Museum Schloss Morsbroich, Leverkusen
 1995 "Insights", ifa (Institute for Foreign Relations), Berlin
 1995 "On Paper - Art of the 20th Century at Deutsche Bank", Kunsthalle Schirn, Frankfurt am Main
 1994 Musée d'Art Moderne et Contemporain, Liège
 1994 Art Museum in the Ehrenhof, Düsseldorf
 1994 "Am Mont Ventoux", Galerie Stefan Röpke, Cologne
 1994 "German Painters after 1945", Busch-Reisinger Museum, Cambridge
 1993 "Retrospective", Albertinum, Dresden
 1993 "Head and Figure", Beethovenstrasse Gallery, Düsseldorf
 1992 "Pictures, Watercolors and Drawings", Loeper Gallery, Hamburg
 1991 "Paintings and watercolors, drawings and graphics", Museum Schloss Morsbroich, Leverkusen
 1991 "Nordic Plenary - Impressions of a Landscape", Beethovenstrasse Gallery, Düsseldorf
 1991 "Blickwechsel", Gallery von Oppenheim, Cologne
 1990 Galerie Brusberg Berlin (exhibition with Ernst Marow)
 1990 Museum Waldhof, Bielefeld
 1990 "Pictures from Germany", Josef-Haubrich-Kunsthalle, Cologne
 1989 "13 painters from the GDR", Kunsthalle Emden
 1988 Gallery of the Academy of Arts, Berlin
 1987 Gallery at Sachsenplatz, Leipzig
 1986 "From Beuys to Stella - International Graphics", Kupferstichkabinett, Berlin
 1985 "Dresden today - painting and graphics after 1945", Galerie Döbele, Ravensburg
 1984 "Max Uhlig - A Painter from Dresden", Brusberg Gallery, Berlin / Hanover
 1981 "Painting and Graphics of the GDR", Musée d’art modern de la Ville de Paris
 1980 "Painting and Graphics", Central Institute for Nuclear Research, Rossendorf near Dresden
 1980 Alvensleben Gallery, Munich
 1979 Arcade Gallery, Berlin
 1978 Kupferstichkabinett, Dresden
 1978 Mouffe Gallery, Paris
 1977 "Selected watercolors by artists from the GDR", Galerie am Sachsenplatz, Dresden
 1976 North Gallery, Dresden
 1974 "25 Years of Graphics in the GDR", Altes Museum, Berlin
 1974 "Drawings in the Art of the GDR", Kupferstichkabinett, Dresden
 1972 "Contemporary Art of the GDR", Seibu Museum of Art, Tokyo
 1971 Museum of Fine Arts, Leipzig
 1967 State Lindenau Museum, Altenburg
 1964 "8 young artists", Centralne Biuro Wystaw, Warsaw
 1963 Humboldt University, Berlin

Works in museums and public properties 

 Aachen, Ludwig Forum for International Art
 Albstadt, Albstadt Art Museum
 Altenburg, State Lindenau Museum
 Ann Arbor, University of Michigan – Art Gallery
 Basel, Art Museum
 Berkeley, USA, Berkeley Art Museum
 Berlin, Academy of Arts, Neue Nationalgalerie, Kupferstichkabinett, Ostdeutsche Sparkassenstiftung, Märkisches Museum, ifa (Institute for Foreign Relations), Grundkreditbank, German Bundestag, art collection of the federal government Jakob-Kaiser-Haus
 Braunschweig, Duke Anton Ulrich Museum
 Bremen, Art Gallery
 Budapest, Museum of Fine Arts (Graphische Sammlung)
 Cambridge, Busch-Reisinger Museum (Harvard-University-Art Museum)
 Coburg, municipal art collections of the Veste Coburg
 Dresden, State Art Collections, New Masters Gallery, Kupferstichkabinett, Municipal Gallery, Academy of Sciences, Technical University of Dresden, Dresdner Bank Free State of Saxony (Art Fund), Ostsächsische Sparkasse Dresden, Deutsche Bank, Volksbank
 Düsseldorf, art museum in the courtyard of honor, provincial insurance
 Emden, art gallery
 Erfurt, Angermuseum
 Esslingen, Villa Merkel (municipal gallery), Sparkasse Esslingen
 Frankfurt / Main, Deutsche Bank, Telekom, Museum for Communication
 Frankfurt / Oder, Young Art Gallery
 Gera, Orangery Art Gallery
 Halle, Moritzburg Art Museum (graphic collection)
 Hamburg, Kunsthalle (graphic collection), ART collection, Evangelical Academy
 Hanover, Lower Saxony Sparkassenstiftung, Lower Saxony State Chancellery, Preussen Elektra, Sprengel Museum, collection of the Norddeutsche Landesbank
 Jena, Romantic House Literature Museum, Jena-Optik
 Kaunas, Ciurlionis Museum
 Kiel, Kunsthalle, Schleswig-Holstein Ministry of Culture
 Leipzig, Museum of Fine Arts, Painting Collection & Graphic Cabinet, Telekom
 Leverkusen, Morsbroich Castle Museum
 Lodz, Museum Sztuky
 London, British Museum (graphic collection), Tate Gallery (graphic collection), Victoria & Albert Museum (graphic collection)
 Mainz, ZDF - art collection
 Magdeburg, Kunstmuseum Kloster Unser Lieben Frauen
 Magdeburg, St. Johannis Church, artistically designed glazing of the 14 large Gothic windows (2014–2020)
 Munich, Städtische Galerie im Lenbachhaus, State Gallery of Modern Art (graphic collection), Dresdner Bank
 New York, Metropolitan Museum of Art (Graphic Collection), McCrory Corporation
 Nuremberg, Germanic National Museum, Nuremberg Art Gallery
 Oberhausen, Stadtische Galerie Schloss Oberhausen
 Osnabrück, Felix Nussbaum House
 Paris, National Library of France
 Regensburg, Art Forum East German Gallery
 Rostock, Rostock art gallery
 Schleswig, Gottorf Castle Museum
 Schwerin, State Museum
 Seoul, South Korea, Korea University
 St. Louis, St. Louis Art Museum, Saint Louis University Museum, Pulitzer Foundation
 Stuttgart, State Gallery, IBM Collection, Daimler Art Collection
 Szczecin, National Museum
 Warsaw, National Museum (Graphic Collection)
 Washington, Library of Congress (Graphic Collection)
 Weimar, State Art Collections
 Vienna, Albertina (graphic collection)
 Wiesbaden, Wiesbaden Museum
 Würzburg, Diocesan Museum

Literature 

 Francisco Tanzer, Max Uhlig: Zeichen und Zeilen. Poems and pictures. Rimbaud, Aachen 1999. ISBN 3-89086-826-6
 Renate Wiehager; Christian Gögger; Galerie Döbele GmbH, Dresden (Ed.): Max Uhlig: Aquarelle und farbige Zeichnungen aus drei Jahrzehnten. Sandstein Verlag, Dresden 2011, ISBN 978-3-942422-47-5
 Agnes Matthias; Bernhard Maaz; Kupferstich-Kabinett, Dresden (ed.): Max Uhlig. Druck. Sandstein Verlag, Dresden 2012, ISBN 978-3-95498-006-2
 Annegret Laabs (ed.): Max Uhlig. Die Fenster der Johanniskirche/The Windows of the St. Johannis Church, Hirmer Verlag, Munich 2020, ISBN 978-3-7774-3657-9.

Exhibition catalogs 

 Max Uhlig - works on paper. Städtische Galerie Albstadt, February 4 to March 17, 1996. Albstadt 1996. ISBN 3-923644-68-X
 Max Uhlig - On Mont Ventoux. Pictures from southern France 1991 to 1993. Villa Merkel, Gallery of the City of Esslingen am Neckar, January 16–13. February 1994. Cantz, Ostfildern 1994. ISBN 3-89322-609-5
 Max Uhlig - paintings, watercolors, drawings, graphics, sketchbooks. Kupferstich-Kabinett, Staatliche Kunstsammlungen Dresden, December 5, 1993–13. February 1994. Dresden 1993.
 Lothar Lang: Max Uhlig, street scenes. Drawings 1984–1987. Exhibition from April 7 to June 17, 1990. State Museum Schloss Burgk, Neue Galerie. Burgk (Saale) 1990. ISBN 3-86103-011-X
 Max Uhlig (* 1937), Mensch und Landschaft, January 17 to March 17, 2013, Käthe Kollwitz Museum Cologne

References

External links

20th-century German painters
20th-century German male artists
German male painters
21st-century German painters
21st-century German male artists
1937 births
Living people
Artists from Dresden
Recipients of the Order of Merit of the Free State of Saxony